The women's 100 metres competition at the 2006 Asian Games in Doha, Qatar was held on 8 and 9 December 2006 at the Khalifa International Stadium.

Schedule
All times are Arabia Standard Time (UTC+03:00)

Records

Results

1st round 
 Qualification: First 2 in each heat (Q) and the next 2 fastest (q) advance to the final.

Heat 1 
 Wind: −0.5 m/s

Heat 2 
 Wind: +0.1 m/s

Heat 3 
 Wind: +0.2 m/s

Final 
 Wind: +0.2 m/s

References

External links 
Results – 1st Round Heat 1
Results – 1st Round Heat 2
Results – 1st Round Heat 3
Results – Final

Athletics at the 2006 Asian Games
2006